Tugo moja (My Sorrow) is the seventh release and seventh gramophone record by Bosnian folk singer Beba Selimović. It was released 26 September 1964 through the label Jugoton.

Track listing

Personnel
Narodni Ansambl Jovice Petkovića – ensemble

References

1964 albums
Beba Selimović albums
Jugoton albums